The Women's 100 metre freestyle competition of the 2016 FINA World Swimming Championships (25 m) was held on 7 and 8 December 2016.

Records
Prior to the competition, the existing world and championship records were as follows.

Results

Heats
The heats were held at 10:17.

Semifinals
The semifinals were held at 19:36.

Semifinal 1

Semifinal 2

Final
The final was held at 18:37.

References

Women's 100 metre freestyle